There have been several battles set in and around the current city of Nanjing (previously named Jianye (before 313 AD), Jiankang (313-1368) and Nanking (1368-1982)) in China. The battle of Nanking may refer to:

Jianye:
 Fall of Jianye (280) by the Jin Dynasty

Jiankang:
 Sack of Jiankang (549) by the Liang Dynasty

Nanking/Nanjing:
 Sack of Nanjing (1402), during the Ming Dynasty succession war of Zhu Di
 Battle of Nanjing (1659), an attack by Koxinga on Qing controlled Nanjing during the Transition from Ming to Qing
 First Battle of Nanjing (1853), during the Taiping Rebellion
 Second Battle of Nanking (1856), during the Taiping Rebellion
 Third Battle of Nanking (1864), during the Taiping Rebellion
 Nanking Uprising (1911), during the Xinhai Revolution
 Nanking incident of 1927, when the Nationalists captured the city from the Beiyang government
 Battle of Nanking (1937), Japanese capture Nanking
 Rape of Nanking (1937), the sacking of Nanking after the Japanese captured the city

See also
 Nanjing Incident (disambiguation)
 Nanjing (disambiguation)
 Nanking (disambiguation)
 Jiankang (disambiguation)
 Jianye (disambiguation)